The Japanese destroyer {{nihongo|Hasu|蓮|}} was one of 21 s built for the Imperial Japanese Navy (IJN) in the late 1910s. After serving for 23 years and throughout the Pacific War, she was retired 12 October 1945 and scuttled as breakwater in Fukui in 1946.

Design and description
The Momi class was designed with higher speed and better seakeeping than the preceding  second-class destroyers. Hasu was powered by two Parsons geared steam turbines, each driving one propeller shaft using steam provided by three Kampon water-tube boilers. Their crew consisted of 110 officers and crewmen.

The main armament of the Momi-class ships consisted of three  Type 3 guns in single mounts; one gun forward of the well deck, one between the two funnels, and the last gun atop the aft superstructure. The guns were numbered '1' to '3' from front to rear. The ships carried two above-water twin sets of  torpedo tubes; one mount was in the well deck between the forward superstructure and the bow gun and the other between the aft funnel and aft superstructure.

In 1939–40, Hishi was converted into a patrol boat. Her torpedo tubes, minesweeping gear, and aft 12 cm gun were removed in exchange for two triple mounts for license-built  Type 96 light AA guns and 60 depth charges.

Construction and career
Hasu, built at the Uraga Dock Company in Uraga, was launched on December 8, 1921 and completed on July 31st, 1922. The ship served throughout the Sino-Japanese War and World War II. It was officially retired on October 12, 1945 and was scuttled as a breakwater in Fukui in 1946.

Notes

References

1921 ships
Ships built by Uraga Dock Company
Momi-class destroyers
Ships sunk by US aircraft
Maritime incidents in March 1944
World War II shipwrecks in the Pacific Ocean